Lincoln School is situated in Nepal, Kathmandu. The school is an independent, non-sectarian, coeducational school, with a pre-school through 12 grade program. The school currently enrolls approximately 240 students. Lincoln School is accredited by two internationally recognized accrediting agencies: the Middle States Association of Colleges and Schools/Commissions on Elementary and Secondary Schools (MSA-CESS), and the Council of International Schools (CIS).

References

External links

Lincoln School website

Schools in Kathmandu
International schools in Nepal
American international schools in Asia
1954 establishments in Nepal
Educational institutions established in 1954